The 2007–08 Maltese First Division (known as 2007–08 BOV First Division for sponsorship reasons) started on October 9, 2007 and ended on May 23, 2008. Marsa and St. George's were the teams which were relegated from the 2006–07 Maltese Premier League. Dingli Swallows and Mellieha were the promoted teams from the 2006–07 Maltese Second Division. Tarxien Rainbows finished as champions and were promoted to the 2008–09 Maltese Premier League. They were joined with Qormi, who won a play-off with Mosta 4-3 on penalties, following a 0-0 draw. The play-off was necessary because the two teams finished level on points. Mellieħa and Marsa were relegated to the 2008–09 Maltese Second Division. Mellieha had just been promoted but went straight down. Marsa suffered two straight relegations, having been relegated from the Premier League.

Teams

The Maltese First Division 2007–08 was made up of these teams:
 Dingli Swallows
 Marsa
 Mellieħa
 Mosta
 Qormi
 Senglea Athletic
 St. Georges
 St.Patrick
 Tarxien Rainbows
 Vittoriosa Stars

Changes from previous season

 Ħamrun Spartans and Mqabba were promoted to the Premier League. They were replaced with St. Georges and Marsa, both relegated from 2006–07 Maltese Premier League.
 San Ġwann and Naxxar Lions were relegated to 2007–08 Maltese Second Division. They were replaced with Dingli Swallows and Mellieħa.

League table

Promotion Play off

|}
 The playoff was played due to Mosta and Qormi finished level on points.
 Qormi promoted.

Results

Top scorers

References

Maltese First Division seasons
Malta
2